Manasugala Mathu Madhura is a 2008 Indian Kannada-language romance film written and directed by Manju Maskalmatti, making his debut. Produced by M Srinivas Kengeri, it features  Anand and Hariprriya in the lead roles. The supporting cast includes Avinash and Mukyamanthri Chandru. The score and soundtrack for the film is by K. Kalyan and the cinematography is by H C Venu.

Cast 

 Anand
 Hariprriya
 Avinash
 Mukyamantri Chandru
 Bhavya
 Pavithra Lokesh
 Rekha Das

Soundtrack 

The film's background score and the soundtrack are composed and written by K. Kalyan. The music rights were acquired by Ananda Audio.

References 

2000s Kannada-language films
2000s romance films
Indian romance films
Films scored by K. Kalyan